Alexandre Chevrier (born December 26, 1992) is a professional Canadian football linebacker for the Toronto Argonauts of the Canadian Football League (CFL).

University career
Chevrier played U Sports football for the Sherbrooke Vert et Or from 2013 to 2017.

Professional career

Saskatchewan Roughriders
Chevrier was drafted in the seventh round, 55th overall, in the 2017 CFL Draft by the Saskatchewan Roughriders and was signed on May 26, 2017. He attended training camp with the team, but returned to Sherbrooke to complete his final year of college eligibility. He re-signed with the Roughriders on December 19, 2017. Chevrier made his professional debut on June 30, 2018 against the Montreal Alouettes and played in the remaining 16 regular season games that year, recording 16 special teams tackles. He played in all 18 regular season games in 2019 where he had 12 special teams tackles. He did not play in 2020 due to the cancellation of the 2020 CFL season. He became a free agent in 2021.

Montreal Alouettes
On February 10, 2021, it was announced that Chevrier had signed with the Montreal Alouettes. He played in four games with the team and recorded two special teams tackles before being released on September 14, 2021.

Toronto Argonauts
Soon after his release from Montreal, Chevrier signed with the Toronto Argonauts on September 20, 2021.

References

External links
Toronto Argonauts bio 

1992 births
Living people
Canadian football linebackers
Montreal Alouettes players
People from Pointe-Claire
Players of Canadian football from Quebec
Saskatchewan Roughriders players
Sherbrooke Vert et Or football players